Levon Geghamyan (born 25 July 1977) is a retired Armenian Greco Roman wrestler.

He became a Cadet World Champion in 1993, a Junior World Champion in 1994, and a Junior European Champion in 1997. Geghamyan won a silver medal at the 2003 European Wrestling Championships. Geghamyan is also a three-time Olympian, having competed at the 1996 Summer Olympics, 2000 Summer Olympics, and 2004 Summer Olympics. His most noteworthy Olympic win was against 2008 Olympic gold medalist Andrea Minguzzi, whom Geghamyan defeated via grand superiority (11-0) at the 2004 Olympics.

References

External links
 

1977 births
Living people
People from Akhuryan
Armenian wrestlers
Armenian male sport wrestlers
Wrestlers at the 1996 Summer Olympics
Wrestlers at the 2000 Summer Olympics
Wrestlers at the 2004 Summer Olympics
Olympic wrestlers of Armenia
European Wrestling Championships medalists
21st-century Armenian people